Moja TV is a Bosnian IPTV provider, subsidiary of the BH Telecom, which provides various thematic channels, HD and Timeshift channels, Video on demand, video recording, the use of an Electronic Program Guide (EPG) and other similar services. Customers must purchase or rent an IPTV set-top box and subscribe one of the four basic TV packages: Moja TV Phone, Moja TV Net, Moja TV Full and Moja TV Premi. There is also MojaTV Biz is a service designed for business customers.

A special Pay-per-view TV channels Moja TV Sport 1 and Moja TV Sport 2  are dedicated to the most attractive matches of the Premier League of Bosnia and Herzegovina. Moja TV Sport channels are the owners of TV rights for the football match between FK Sarajevo and FK Željezničar (Sarajevo's Derby match).

On 31 July 2012 BH Telecom signed a two year deal with Football Federation of Bosnia and Herzegovina regarding the sponsorship and broadcasting rights of the league, effectively renaming the league to BH Telecom Premier League. The contract was extended in 2014, 2016, 2018 for another 2 years.

In all packages there are special TV channels that broadcast live pictures from 40 panoramic cameras from the major Bosnian cities and tourist destinations. Musical background consists of a program of national or local radio stations (BH Radio 1, RSG Radio etc.).

Moja TV HD package (with HD TV channels) costs about 4 KM (BAM) per month. Optional package with 20+ television channels (Pink + Package) costs 3.50 KM (BAM) per month while  "Cinema TV" is charged separately for 1 KM per month.

All HBO and Cinemax channels costs about 10 KM (BAM) per month.

Moja TV channel line-up

The program packages offered by Moja TV currently (as September 2020) offers more than 247 TV channels,  61 radio stations and 49 live city/panoramic cameras.

 1. BHRT - BHT 1
 2. Federalna TV
 3. OBN
 4. Hayat TV
 5. Al Jazeera Balkans
 6. BIR TV HD
 7. Pink BH (ex. Pink Media BH)
 8. TVSA
 9. MTV Igman
 10. Face TV
 11. Imperia TV HD
 12. RTV TK
 13. RTV Slon
 14. O Kanal 
 15. BN Televizija
 16. NTV IC Kakanj
 17. RTV Zenica
 18. RTV USK
 19. Alfa TV
 20. Hayat Folk
 21. Hayat Music 
 22. Hayat Plus
 23. Alternativna TV
 24. RTV Vogošća
 25. RTV Visoko
 26. RTV Maglaj
 27. Kanal 6
 28. RTRS
 29. Elta 1
 30. Izvorna TV
 31. HIT TV
 32. NTV Amna
 33. RTV Lukavac
 34. NTV Jata
 35. NTV Jasmin
 36. Smart TV
 37. RTV BPK Goražde
 38. RTV Cazin
 39. Kanal 3
 40. RTV Živinice
 41. OSM TV
 42. BDC TV
 43. RTV Jablanica
 44. FOX
 45. FOX Life
 46. FOX Crime
 47. FOX Movies
 48. National Geographic
 49. Nat Geo Wild
 50. 24 Kitchen
 51. Sky News International
 52. HBO HD
 53. HBO 2 HD
 54. HBO 3 HD
 55. Cinemax HD
 56. Cinemax 2 HD
 57. Arena Sport 1 BiH
 58. Arena Sport 1
 59. Arena Sport 1 HR
 60. Arena Sport 2
 61. Arena Sport 3
 62. Arena Sport 4
 63. Eurosport 1 HD
 64. Eurosport 2 HD
 65. HRT 1
 66. HRT 2
 67. HRT 3
 68. TV SLO 1 HD
 69. RTL Televizija
 70. RTL 2 Hrvatska
 71. RTL Kockica
 72. KCN 1 Kopernikus
 73. KCN 2 Music
 74. KCN 3 Svet+
 75. MTV Europe
 76. VH1
 77. Animal Planet HD
 78. Discovery Channel HD
 79. Discovery Science HD
 80. Discovery TX HD
 81. History Channel HD
 82. Investigation Discovery HD
 83. TLC
 84. Travel Channel
 85. M1 Film HD
 86. M1 Gold HD
 87. Nicktoons
 88. Minimax
 89. Nickeleodeon
 90. Nick Jr.
 91. English Club TV
 92. TV 7
 93. Pink Kids
 94. Pink Action
 95. Pink Thriller
 96. Pink Crime & Mystery
 97. Pink Comedy
 98. Pink Family
 99. Pink Film
 100. Pink Horror
 101. Pink Movies
 102. Pink Romance
 103. Pink Sci-Fi&Fantasy
 104. Pink Premium
 105. Pink Soap
 106. Pink
 107. Pink 2 HD
 108. Pink Extra
 109. Pink Fashion
 110. Pink Koncert
 111. Pink Folk 1
 112. Pink Folk 1
 113. Pink M
 114. Pink Music
 115. Pink Music 2
 116. Pink Hits 2
 117. Pink Hits
 118. City Play
 119. Pink Pedia
 120. Pink Plus
 121. Pink n Roll
 122. Pink Reality
 123. Pink World
 124. Pink Zabava
 125. Pink Classic
 126. Pink Style
 127. Pink Western
 128. Bravo Music
 129. ProSieben
 130. SAT.1
 131. France 24 English
 132. France 24 Francias
 133. France 24 Arabic
 134. RTCG Sat
 135. RTS Svet
 136. RTS 1
 137. RTS 2
 138. Euronews 
 139. Arirang TV
 140. DM SAT
 141. Sandžak TV
 142. RTV Novi Pazar
 143. Islam Channel
 144. Baby TV 
 145. Moja TV Info
 146. Moja TV Sport - owned by BH Telecom 
 147. Arena Sport 1 BiH HD
 148. Arena Sport 2 HD
 149. Arena Sport 3 HD
 150. Arena Sport 5 HD
 151. Al Jazeera Balkans HD
 152. BHT 1 HD
 153. Hayat HD 
 154. "Das ist Sarajevo" - Camera
 155. Bjelašnica - Camera
 156. Dolac Malta (Sarajevo) - City Camera
 157. Igman - Panoramic Camera
 158. Jahorina - Panoramic Camera
 159. Mojmilo (Sarajevo) - Panoramic Camera
 160. Mostar - City Camera
 161. Neum - Panoramic Camera
 162. Stolac - Panoramic camera
 163. Travnik  - Panoramic camera
 164. Visoko piramide - City Camera
 165. Vlašić - Panoramic Camera
 166. Cinema TV (* 1 BAM)
 167. Elta 1 HD
 168. Face TV HD
 173. BH Radio 1
 174. Federalni Radio
 175. Antena Sarajevo
 176. RSG Radio
 177. Radio M
 178. Radio Slon
 179. Radio BIR
 180. Radio Gračanica
 181. Radio Bosanska Krupa
 182. Radio USK
 183. Radio Glas Drine
 184. Radio Studio D
 185. Radio Usora
 186. Radio Lukavac
 187. Novi Radio Bihać
 188. Radio Kalman
 189. Radio Kameleon
 190. Radio Bihać
 191. TNT Radio Travnik
 192. Radio Vogošća
 193. Radio Tuzla (ex. Radio 7)
 194. Radio Cazin
 195. Radio Marija BiH
 196. Radio Prača
 197. Radio Visoko
 198. Narodni Radio
 199. Radio Goražde
 200. Radio TK
 201. Radio BA
 202. Radio Antena Jelah
 203. RTL Living
 204. Saudi Quran
 205. CCTV 4
 206. CGTN Documentary
 207. CGTN
 208. Radio Bet
 209. CITY TV
 210. Bihać - City Camera
 211. TV Glas Drine
 216. Pink Fight Network
 217. Pink Kuvar
 218. Pink Show
 219. Pink Serije
 220. Pink World Cinema
 221. Pink Super Kids
 222. Radio Republike Srpske
 223. Radio Feral Kalesija
 224. Hayatovci
 225. BN Music
 226. Kakanj - Panoramic Camera
 227. Mostar - Panoramic Camera
 228. Slow Radio
 229. Sky Radio 90
 230. Sky Radio Lovesongs
 231. Sky Radio 00s Hits
 232. Sky Radio Lounge
 233. IP Music Radio
 234. IP Music Slow Radio
 235. RTV Bugojno
 236. Mosaic 1 (Moja TV Camera overview)
 237. Televizija 5
 238. Trebević (Sarajevo) - Panoramic Camera
 239. MTV Igman HD
 240. Radio Kakanj
 241. Radio Bugojno
 242. Konjic - City Camera
 243. Goražde - Camera
 244. Radio Konjic
 245. RTV Sana
 246. Radio Mix
 247. City TV HD
 248. RTL.de
 249. Sarajevo, Trg BiH - City Camera
 250. Radio Zenica
 251. Radio Otvorena Mreža
 252. Radio Sarajevo 90,2
 253. Konjic 2 - City Camera
 254. Tuzla - Panoramic Camera
 255. Tatabrada TV
 256. Sevdah TV
 257. Radio Donji Vakuf
 258. Pink HA HA
 259. Pink LOL
 260. Panonska jezera, Tuzla  - City Camera
 261. Smetovi, Zenica - Panoramic Camera
 262. Radio Zenit
 263. TVSA HD
 264. Kanal 6 HD
 265. Al Jazeera Arabic
 266. Solar Radio
 267. LoungeFM
 268. FM4 Radio
 269. Jablanica - Panoramic Camera
 270. Mosaic 2 (Moja TV Camera overview)
 271. Zenica - City Camera
 272. Bjelašnica 2 - Panoramic Camera
 273. Gračanica - City Camera
 274. Goražde 2 - Panoramic Camera
 275. Sarajevo, Skenderija - City Camera
 276. Cazin - City Camera
 277. MTV Hits
 278. MTV Rocks
 279. VH 1 Classic
 280. Banja Luka - Panoramic Camera
 281. RTRS Plus
 282. Radio Gradačac
 283. Radio Mir
 284. Club MTV
 285. Moja TV Sport 2 - owned by BH Telecom 
 286. Hayatovci HD
 287. Televizija 5 HD 
 288. RtV Vogošća HD
 289. Fojnica - Panoramic Camera
 290. TV 7 HD
 291. M1 Family
 292. Hayat Folk HD
 293. Hayat Music HD 
 294. Hayat Plus HD
 295. Maglaj - Panoramic Camera
 296. Hi On Line Radio Jazz
 297. Hit Radio Namur
 298. Sky Radio 10s Hits
 299. Blagaj - City Camera
 300. TRT World
 301. TRT World HD
 302. Moj radio - owned by BH Telecom
 303. Ravna Planina - Panoramic Camera
 304. Trebević Cable Car, Sarajevo - Panoramic Camera
 305. RTV USK HD
 306. Arirang TV HD
 307. CGTN HD
 308. CCTV 4 HD
 309. CGTN Documentary HD
 310. Bugojno - Panoramic Camera
 311. Pink TimeOut
 312. Tešanj - City Camera
 313. Tropik TV
 314. TV Glas Drine HD
 315. B1 TV HD
 316. Zavidovići - Panoramic Camera
 317. RTV Dom, Sarajevo - City Camera
 318. TRT Arabi
 319. TRT Arabi HD
 320. Jajce - Panoramic Camera
 321. RadiYo Active Zenica
 322. OTV Valentino
 323. Una river canyon, Bihać - Panoramic Camera
 324. Radio Valentino
 325. TV Podrinje
 326. Moj Film - owned by BH Telecom
 327. Lov i Ribolov
 328. Pikaboo
 329. Vavoom
 330. Grand TV
 331. N1 Bosna i Hercegovina
 332. Sport Klub 1
 333. Sport Klub 2
 334. Sport Klub 3
 335. Sport Klub 4
 336. Sport Klub 5
 337. Sport Klub 6
 338. Sport Klub 7
 339. Sport Klub 8
 340. Sport Klub 9
 341. Sport Klub 10
 342. Sport Klub Golf
 343. Sport Klub eSports
 344. Hema TV
 345. NTV IC Kakanj HD
 346. RTV Slon HD
 347. RTV Cazin HD
 348. RTV Zenica HD
 349. Trebinje - Panoramic Camera
 350. Gradačac - City Camera
 351. Neon TV HD
 353. Super Media TV
 354. Nickeleodeon HD
 355. Bihać - Panoramic Camera
 356. Eternal flame, Sarajevo - City Camera
 357. Ferhadija, Sarajevo - City Camera

See also 
 BH Telecom
 List of cable television companies in BiH
 List of radio stations in Bosnia and Herzegovina
 Television in Bosnia and Herzegovina

References

External links
Moja TV Bosnia and Herzegovina
BH Telecom

Cable television companies
Television in Bosnia and Herzegovina
Communications in Bosnia and Herzegovina